Machaín or Machain is a surname. Notable people with the surname include:

Facundo Machaín (1845–1877), President of Paraguay
Humberto Álvarez Machaín, physician from Mexico accused of aiding in the torture and killing of Enrique Camarena Salazar in 1985

See also
Sosa v. Alvarez-Machain, a cause of action must be universally recognized by the law of nations as a prohibited norm in order to be actionable
United States v. Alvarez-Machain, 504 U.S. 655 (1992), decision by the United States Supreme Court